Recurring is the fourth and final Spacemen 3 studio album, released in early 1991 on Fire Records. The band had broken up prior to the release of the album.  During the recording, the relations between band members had soured to the extent that the record is in two parts – the first side by Peter Kember, and the second by Jason Pierce.

The album includes "Hypnotized", a Pierce composition that was released as a single in the UK in 1989.

Recurring peaked at No. 46 on the UK Albums Chart.

Versions 
The original UK vinyl pressing had only ten tracks, with shorter edits of two tracks. "Big City" was cut in half and "Billy Whizz" faded out before its "Blue 1" crescendo. The cassette release contained the same track listing but with full versions of all tracks.

"Just to See You Smile" originally appeared on the B-side of "Hypnotized", in an alternate mix listed as "Just to See You Smile (Honey Pt. 2)", owning up to the track's melodic affinity to the earlier Spacemen 3 tune "Honey". Elsewhere, "Why Couldn't I See" is another song whose main guitar riff is largely derived from the 45-minute improvisation Dreamweapon (the others were "Honey" and "How Does It Feel"); and "I Love You" features an uncredited sample of a Jan and Dean radio jingle for Coca-Cola (possibly written or cowritten by Brian Wilson, from 1963.)

When Tomorrow Hits 
The only track on which both Pierce and Kember appear is "When Tomorrow Hits", a cover of a Mudhoney song. It was originally intended for a double A-side split single, with Mudhoney covering "Revolution" from Playing With Fire. This release was scotched when Kember caught wind of the fact that Mudhoney had fitted "Revolution" with somewhat irreverent lyrics about methadone suppositories. The Mudhoney recording eventually surfaced as a b-side. There's a subtle continuity between both tracks, specifically duelling references to The Stooges; the Spacemen 3 track opens with the "look out!" invocation that began "Loose", and "When Tomorrow Hits" is mostly a rewrite of "I Wanna Be Your Dog".

Critical reception
Trouser Press called Recurring an "undated adaptation of ’60s folky acid-rock with elements of the Beatles, Stones and others" and a "lullingly pleasant album." The New Rolling Stone Album Guide called the album "bad imitation acid house." Peter Kane in Q Magazine called highlighted the rave-inspired "Big City" and described the rest of the album as "wispy voices atmospherically draped over guitars that sparkle lightly".

Track listing
Original vinyl release (Fire FIRELP23)

Original cassette release (FIRE MC23)

Original CD release (FIRE CD23)

References

Spacemen 3 albums
1991 albums
Shoegaze albums by English artists
Fire Records (UK) albums
RCA Records albums
Dedicated Records albums